Karin Smirnoff, (born 24 September 1964 in Umeå) is a Swedish writer and author.

In December 2021, Smirnoff was announced as the new author of books in the best-selling and award-winning Millennium series, originally created by Stieg Larsson. Smirnoff said she accepted the offer to write three books without hesitation, despite knowing it would postpone her own ideas for original novels, and stated "The Millennium books are classics in their genre, where the combination of unforgettable characters and the strong political and societal engagement still fascinates readers. I will continue to build on Stieg Larsson's core themes, such as violence, abuse of power, and contemporary political currents."

Bibliography
2018 –  (Jana Kippo, #1): Stockholm: Polaris. 
2019 –  (Jana Kippo, #2): Stockholm: Polaris. 
2020 –  (Jana Kippo, #3): Stockholm: Polaris. 
2021 – . Stockholm:  Polaris. 
2023 (2022) - The Girl in the Eagle's Talons (Havsörnens skrik)
TBA - Second novel
TBA - Third novel

References

External links 

1964 births
Living people
Swedish writers
Millennium (novel series)